HNLMS Tijgerhaai (P336) was a  of the Royal Netherlands Navy during and after World War II. She was originally ordered as HMS Tarn (P326), a British T-class submarine, built by Vickers Armstrong, Barrow, but never saw service under that name.  She would have been the only ship of the Royal Navy to bear the name Tarn.

Career

The submarine was laid down on 12 June 1943, and launched on 29 November 1944. She was not commissioned into the Royal Navy, instead being transferred to the Royal Netherlands Navy and commissioned into service on 28 March 1945. She was renamed Tijgerhaai.

Tijgerhaai was commissioned as the war was drawing to a close and spent much of 1945 undergoing trials.  She had a relatively quiet career, of note being the fact that she was tied up inboard of  when Sidon suffered a torpedo malfunction and sank.  On 19 October 1955, she ran aground in Weymouth Bay, and had to be pulled off by tugs.   She was decommissioned on 11 December 1964 and was sold to be broken up for scrap on 5 November 1965.

References

Citations

Sources
 
 

 

British T-class submarines of the Royal Navy
Ships built in Barrow-in-Furness
1944 ships
World War II submarines of the United Kingdom
Zwaardvisch-class submarines
World War II submarines of the Netherlands
Articles containing video clips
Maritime incidents in 1955